Paul Neurath is a video game designer and creative director. He founded both Blue Sky Productions (later renamed Looking Glass Studios) and Floodgate Entertainment. He was the creative director of Zynga Boston. In 2014 he founded OtherSide Entertainment, that developed Underworld Ascendant, the third game in the Underworld series.

Neurath had a game credited to him as early as 1986, the computer adaptation of the Steve Jackson Games board game Ogre. As Creative Director at Looking Glass Studios, he oversaw such acclaimed gaming titles as Thief, Terra Nova and Flight Unlimited, as well as Ultima Underworld and its sequel.

Games credited

References 

Year of birth missing (living people)
Living people
Origin Systems people
Video game designers
Video game programmers